Charles Edwin Irwin (February 15, 1869 – September 21, 1925) was an American professional baseball third baseman. He played ten seasons in Major League Baseball (MLB) between 1893 and 1902 for the Chicago Colts, Cincinnati Reds, Brooklyn Superbas.

In 991 games over 10 seasons, Irwin posted a .268 batting average (986-for-3685) with 556 runs, 16 home runs, 493 RBI, 180 stolen bases and 287 bases on balls.

See also
List of Major League Baseball career stolen bases leaders

References

External links

1869 births
1925 deaths
Major League Baseball third basemen
Baseball players from Illinois
Chicago Colts players
Cincinnati Reds players
Brooklyn Superbas players
19th-century baseball players
Road incident deaths in Illinois
Pedestrian road incident deaths
Minor league baseball managers
Seattle Reds players
Oakland Colonels players
Seattle Hustlers players
St. Paul Apostles players
San Francisco Seals (baseball) managers
San Francisco Seals (baseball) players
Denver Grizzlies (baseball) players
People from Clinton, Illinois